CondomMan.com is an online retailer of condoms and healthcare products headquartered in Valencia, California. Its web operations were launched in 2002. The website distributes over 10 million condoms yearly to customers, non-profit organizations, and wholesale distributors.

Since its inception in 2002, the company has actively engaged in various safe sex awareness campaigns. In addition to its commercial site, CondomMan.com maintains an active blog of safe sex educational material and a comprehensive compilation of research done on HIV and AIDS prevention and awareness.

In February 2007, the company gained a significant amount of press when it sent 2000 condoms to NFL quarterback Tom Brady. This was a week after he had announced that he had impregnated his ex-girlfriend, actress Bridget Moynahan.

CondomMan.com is wholly owned by Green Web, Inc., a private corporation which distributes health and beauty products to retailers worldwide.

References

External links
 Hoovers Fact Sheet: http://www.hoovers.com/free/burn.xhtml?pageid=4375

Health care companies based in California
Companies based in Los Angeles County, California
Retail companies established in 2002
Online retailers of the United States
Internet properties established in 2002
Santa Clarita, California
2002 establishments in California
Contraception for males